Panama requires its residents to register their motor vehicles and display vehicle registration plates. Current plates are North American standard 12 × 6 inches (300 × 152 mm).

All vehicles are required to display plates on the back of the vehicle. Front license plates are not required. Additionally, taxis in Panama are also required to display plates on the sides. This is done not with actual metal plates, but by a large decal of the license plate.

1925-1956

1957 to Present

References

Weblinks

 Panama license plates pictures at Francoplaque

Further reading
 Gobierno genera ahorro y transparencia en alquiler de autos para el Estado (in Spanish)
  La Carrera Panamericana (in Spanish)

Panama
Transport in Panama
Panama transport-related lists